Mario Ventimiglia (7 March 1921 – 6 June 2005) was an Italian professional football player, manager and chairman.

1921 births
People from Sanremo
Italian footballers
Serie A players
Juventus F.C. players
U.C. Sampdoria players
S.S.D. Sanremese Calcio players
2005 deaths
Association football midfielders
Footballers from Liguria
Sportspeople from the Province of Imperia